The small red-eyed damselfly (Erythromma viridulum) is a member of the damselfly family Coenagrionidae. It is very similar to the red-eyed damselfly.

Appearance

Its large, spaced eyes are a deep red. Like the red-eyed damselfly, both sexes lack pale spots behind the eyes and have pale brown pterostigmata. The male has a bronze-black top and blue sides. The sides of the female's thorax are yellow, green or blue. The rear edge of the pronotum is rounded.

Viewed from the side, the second and eighth segment of the abdomen of the male are mostly blue, which distinguishes it from the red-eyed damselfly where these are mostly black.

Breeding

This damselfly breeds in ponds, lakes and ditches and, in continental Europe, sluggish rivers. It seems to be well able to tolerate brackish water. It seems to be associated with floating vegetation such as Hornwort and Water Milfoil (Myriophyllum).

Eggs are laid while in tandem, into the stems and leaves of floating plants. The larvae live amongst pondweed and probably emerge after a year.

Behaviour

Mating occurs either on floating plants or at the margins. When perched on floating plants, the male holds its abdomen slightly upcurved (the red-eyed damselfly holds it straight).

Colonisation of Britain

The populations of this species in northwest Europe increased in the latter part of the 20th century, and in 1999 the species was recorded in Britain for the first time. It has since increased its range considerably and become an established breeding resident. The first British record was in Essex on 17 July 1999 and is documented in Dewick and Gerussi (2000). Breeding was finally proven in 2002.

References

 Dewick, Stephen and Richard Gerussi (2000) "Small Red-eyed Damselfly Erythromma viridulum (Charpentier) Found Breeding in Essex - The First British Records" Atropos No. 9 pp. 3–4

External links 
 Finding Erythromma viridulum in the Southern Urals (Russia) 

Coenagrionidae
Damselflies of Europe
Insects described in 1840